Musi-Video was a music video series which ran in Canada between 1980 and 1984, syndicated to community channels across Canada. It was a very early example of the format that later would be adopted by the creation of MTV and MuchMusic.

It was the creation of Marc Fontaine, who was also behind the new wave pop group Nudimension. Produced in Montreal, it featured early 1980s music artists playing live in a studio and early music videos.

In 2008 the Musi-Video brand was revived as a Music publishing label by Marc Fontaine.

Presenters

Richard Berle 
Erica Ehm 
Anne Marie Cyr
Marc Fontaine
Andy Nulman

Selected artists
The following artists have featured on Musi-Video at the beginning of their careers:
Men Without Hats
Simple Minds
Nudimension
The 222s
Martha Ladly

References

1980 Canadian television series debuts
1984 Canadian television series endings
Canadian community channel television shows
Television shows filmed in Montreal
1980s Canadian music television series